Mahanagar Telephone Mauritius Limited (MTML) is a division of Mahanagar Telephone Nigam Limited which specialises in  telecommunications and Internet services currently operational in Mauritius. MTML was founded in 2003 as a division of Mahanagar Telephone Nigam Limited (MTNL).

MTML provides basic, mobile and international long-distance services as second operator in Mauritius. Necessary licenses were obtained in January 2004. MTML has, since 2005, already started its ILD & CDMA based basic services in Mauritius. In Mauritius, 144,312 telephone connections are actually operational from a total switching capacity of 200,000. Moreover, through joint ventures with local telecommunications providers, MTML also to offer internet access through its wireless network to its users from February 2007. MTML was incorporated as subsidiary of Mahanagar Telephone Nigam Limited at Mauritius on 14.11.2003 with an authorized capital of MUR 600M and the paid up capital as on 31.3.2008 stands as MUR 436.5 Million. The company
is having license from the telecom regulatory ICTA for Fixed Telephone Services, Mobile Services, International Long Distance Services and Internet Services. It has installed 100K state-of-the-art technology CDMA IX & IX EVDO switch and additional 100K for GSM, with a radio network of 103 base
stations. The system is equipped to provide value added services viz., SMS, DATA, Multi Media service.

Services 

- Fixed Wireless Telephone
- CDMA Mobile Service under brand name "MOKOZE MOBILE"
- International Direct Dialing by Calling Cards
- Dial-Up Internet through Fixed Wireless Phones under brand name "MTML INTERNET EXPRESS SERVICE". 
- Broadband Internet service through EVDO mobile broadband modem and USB card / PC Card under the brand name "MTML AZU Broadband" 
-  GSM/3G Mobile Service under brand name "CHILI GSM"

The Company is second operator in Fixed Line and third operator in Mobile and one among the seven ILD
operators. The company is equipped with call centre (10 positions) and 10 Customer Care centres all over
the island and started its operations in the year 2005–2006 partially. The full operations of the company
started from March 2007.
 The company had the following customer base as of 31.3.2008.
- Fixed Wireless Phones 26,710
- Mobile 8,901
- International Long Distance (through CAC) 5,708
- Internet Customers 2,993

Revenue
 The company earned a gross revenue of MUR 188.8M from services during the year 2007–08 and just broke even during the year 2007–08.
 The fixed assets of the company as of 31.3.2008 MUR 445.27 M.

See also
Communications in Mauritius

External links
official website  

Telecommunications companies of Mauritius
Government-owned companies of Mauritius
Government-owned telecommunications companies
Telecommunications companies established in 2003
2003 establishments in Mauritius
Companies based in Ebene, Mauritius